Kwun Hang is a village of in the Shap Sze Heung area of Sai Kung North, in Tai Po District, Hong Kong.

Administration
Kwun Hang is a recognized village under the New Territories Small House Policy.

Chat Shing Temple
The Chat Shing Temple (七聖古廟) in Kwung Hang was built in 1762 for the worship of the Seven Fairies and the Mother  of  Heaven .

References

External links

 Delineation of area of existing village Kwun Hang (Sai Kung North) for election of resident representative (2019 to 2022)
 Pictures of Chat Shing Temple:   Festival

Villages in Tai Po District, Hong Kong
Sai Kung North